Gerald Celente (born November 29, 1946) is an American trend forecaster, publisher of the Trends Journal, business consultant and author who makes predictions about the global financial markets and other important events.

Background
Celente was born in an Italian American family in The Bronx, New York City, New York. He had early political experience running a mayoral campaign in Yonkers, New York, and served as executive assistant to the secretary of the New York State Senate.

From 1973 to 1979, Celente traveled between the major US cities of Chicago, Illinois and Washington, D.C. as a government affairs specialist. In 1980, Celente founded The Trends Research Institute (at first called the Socio-Economic Research Institute of America), now located in Kingston, New York, publisher of the Trends Journal which forecasts and analyzes business, socioeconomic, political, and other trends.

Forecasting
His forecasts since 1993 have included predictions about terrorism, economic collapses and war. More recent forecasts involve fascism in the United States, food riots and tax revolts. Celente has long predicted global anti-Americanism, a failing economy and immigration woes in the U.S.

In 2009 Celente predicted turmoil which he described as "Obamageddon", and he was a popular guest on conservative cable-TV shows such as Fox News Sunday and Glenn Beck's television program. In April 2009 Celente wrote, "Wall Street controls our financial lives; the media manipulates our minds. These systems cannot be changed from within. There is no alternative. Without a revolution, these institutions will bankrupt the country, keep fighting failed wars, start new ones, and hold us in perpetual intellectual subjugation." Celente has said, "smaller communities, the smaller groups, the smaller states, the more self-sustaining communities, will 'weather the crisis in style' as big cities and hypertrophic suburbias descend into misery and conflict", and forecasts "a downsizing of America".

Hugo Lindgren and ABC News have labelled Celente's predictions "pessimism porn" for their doom and the alleged eschatological thrill some people receive from imagining his predictions of the collapse of civil society in the wake of a global economic crisis.

Trends Journal and Trends Research Institute
Celente established the weekly Trends Journal containing political, economic and social research, analysis, and forecasts. The publication's slogan is "History Before It Happens". It was established in 1980 as a periodical and reflects the opinions of Celente and his Trends Research Institute.

The Research Institute engages in trend forecasting across a wide range of topics including global economics to geopolitics, to health and education etc. It also organizes keynote speaker engagements, and symposiums and engages in private consultations for business and for individuals. Gerald Celente is its founder and director.

Publications
 Trend Tracking: The System to Profit from Today's Trends (1991), 
 Trends 2000: How to Prepare for and Profit from the Changes of the 21st Century (1997), 
 What Zizi Gave Honeyboy: A True Story about Love, Wisdom, and the Soul of America (2002),

References

External links
 trendsresearch.com
 

1946 births
Living people
American economics writers
American male non-fiction writers
Futurologists
People from the Bronx
American writers of Italian descent